The Capture may refer to:

Television 
 The Capture (film), a 1950 drama film directed by John Sturges
 The Capture (TV series), a 2019 British mystery crime-drama series
 The Capture, a nominee for the 1976 Hugo Award for Best Dramatic Presentation

Books 
 The Capture, the first novel in the Guardians of Ga'Hoole book series by Kathryn Lasky
 The Capture (novel), the sixth book in the Animorphs series

See also 
 Capture (disambiguation)